Coan or variation, may refer to:

 Coan (surname)
 Argentine Naval Aviation (abbreviated: COAN)
 Coan Baptist Church, Heathsville, Northumberland County, Virginia, USA
 Coan Middle School, Atlanta, Georgia, USA
 Kos, Greece; where "Coan" is the adjectival form
 Coan wine
 Coan, Virginia, an unincorporated community in Northumberland County, USA
 Coan River, Northern Neck, Virginia, USA; a tributary of the Potomac River

See also

 Lhen Coan, Isle of Man
 Lhen Coan railway station
 James Carlile McCoan (1829-1904), Irish politician
 Coa (disambiguation)
 CO (disambiguation)
 An (disambiguation)
 
 
 Koan (disambiguation)
 Coen (disambiguation)